R is the eighteenth letter of the Latin alphabet.

R or r may also refer to:

Science

Biology and medicine
 Arginine, an amino acid abbreviated as Arg or R
 ATC code R Respiratory system, a section of the Anatomical Therapeutic Chemical Classification System
 Coefficient of relationship (r), in biology
 Effective reproduction number (R), the number of cases generated by one case in the current state of a population in epidemiology
 Basic reproduction number (R0), the expected number of cases directly generated by one case
 Haplogroup R (mtDNA), a human mitochondrial DNA (mtDNA) haplogroup
 Haplogroup R (Y-DNA), a Y-chromosomal DNA (Y-DNA) haplogroup
 Net reproduction rate (R0), the average number of offspring that would be born to a female given conforming conditions
 r, the population growth rate in the r/K selection theory of ecology

Astronomy
 Spectral resolution, in astronomy
 Orangish or K carbon stars (stellar classification: R)

Physics
 R (cross section ratio), the ratio of hadronic to muonic cross sections
 Electrical resistance (R)
 Roentgen (unit) (R), a unit of measurement for ionizing radiation such as X-ray and gamma rays
 Rydberg constant (R∞, RH), a physical constant relating to energy levels of electrons within atoms
 Rydberg unit of energy (Ry), the energy of the photon whose wavenumber is the Rydberg constant

Temperature scales
 Rankine scale (°R, °Ra)
 Réaumur scale (°Ré, °Re, °r)
 Rømer scale (°R, °Rø)

Chemistry
 Gas constant (R), in chemistry
 R, one of two chiral center configurations in the R/S system
 Alkyl group, commonly marked as R in structural formulas
 Side chain (an unspecified group of atoms), in a chemical or structural formula

Mathematics
 r is the symbol for the radius of a circle
  or R, the set of all real numbers
 Pearson product-moment correlation coefficient (r), in statistics
 Ricci curvature

Technology and engineering
 R-value (insulation), a non-SI measure of thermal resistance used in housing insulation
 R-value (soils), property of soils used in pavement design
 Resistor, an electronic component
 R-, a refrigerant numbering system
 R, the ratio between the minimum and maximum stresses in fracture mechanics
 R- or recall-button, now mostly used to switch between two calls

Computing
 R (programming language), an environment for statistical computing and graphics
 R (complexity), the set of all recursive languages
 IBM System R, an IBM database system
 RequestBot, a service in QuakeNet's IRC services

Arts and entertainment

Music
 Ritardando, a term for slowing the tempo down gradually
 R. (R. Kelly album), a 1998 album by R. Kelly
 R° (Ruratia album), a 2002 album by Rurutia
 R (single album), a 2021 single album by Rosé
 Rated R (Queens of the Stone Age album), 2000 album also called R
 R (jp), 2005 J-Pop album by Ryoko Shiraishi

Film
 R (film), a 2010 film by Danish screenwriter and film director Tobias Lindholm
 R, a character played by John Cleese in The World Is Not Enough
 R, the protagonist of Warm Bodies, based on the book of the same name
 R, a film rating in the Motion Picture Association of America film rating system and in the Canadian Home Video Rating System

Television
 Rajawali Televisi (RTV), television in Indonesia
 R, the production code for the 1965 Doctor Who serial The Chase

Video games
 R·Type, an arcade video game
 R: Rock'n Riders, in the list of PlayStation games (M–Z)

Organisations
 The Crown, Rex (King) or Regina (Queen) in Commonwealth nations
 Ryder (NYSE ticker symbol)
 R (cable operator), a telecommunications company
 R, denoting a member of the US Republican Party

Transportation
 Nissan Skyline GT-R, commonly referred to as the R in Japan
 R (New York City Subway service)
 Reconnaissance aircraft (military designation: R)
 Restricted airspace
 Volkswagen R, the performance division of Volkswagen

Other uses
 Registered trademark symbol (®)
 South African rand (R), a currency
 Right (direction)
 Rolled R (IPA: r), the alveolar trill of Spanish, Italian, & Arabic languages
 UTC−05:00 (military time zone code: Romeo)
 Я, a Cyrillic letter similar to R

See also
 R. (disambiguation)
 "R" Is for Ricochet, the eighteenth novel in Sue Grafton's "Alphabet mystery" series, published in 2004
 The three Rs, of reading, writing and arithmetic
 RR (disambiguation)
 RRR (disambiguation)
 RRRR (disambiguation)
 R class (disambiguation)
 Model R (disambiguation)
 Type R (disambiguation)